The 1884–85 Scottish Cup was the 12th season of Scotland's most prestigious football knockout competition. Renton won the competition for the first tie after they defeated Vale of Leven in a replayed final.

Defending champions Queen's Park lost to Battlefield in the third round.

Calendar

Two teams qualified for the second round after drawing their first round replay.
Four teams qualified for the third round after drawing their second round replay.
Two teams qualified for the fifth round after drawing their fourth round replay.

Teams
All 130 teams entered the competition in the first round.

First round
Campsie Central, Dean Park, Heart of Midlothian and Maybole received a bye to the second round.

Matches

Replays

Second replay

Notes

Second round
Cartvale, Hamilton Academical, Morton, Partick, St Bernard's and Vale of Nith received a bye to the third round.

Matches

Replays

Second replay

Notes

Third round
Annbank received a bye to the fourth round.

Matches

Replays

Second replay

Fourth round

Matches

Replays

Notes

Fifth round
Battlefield, Renton, Thornliebank, Vale of Leven and the winners of the replayed Arbroath vs Rangers tie received a bye to the quarter-finals.

Matches

Quarter-finals

Matches

Semi-finals

Matches

Replay

Final

Replay

References

External links
RSSSF: Scottish Cup 1884–85
London Hearts Scottish Cup Results 1884–85
Scottish Football Archive 1884–85

Cup
Scottish Cup seasons
Scot